The first season of Sweden's Idol premiered in August 2004 and continued until its grand finale on 26 November, when 26-year-old Daniel Lindström from Umeå was crowned winner.

Auditions
Auditions were held in the Swedish cities of Stockholm, Gothenburg, Malmö, Umeå and Karlstad during the spring of 2004.

Finals

Finalists
(ages stated at time of contest)

Live Show Details
Two out of eight semi-finalists made it to the live finals each day, based on public phone voting. An additional semi-finalist contestant who had not gained enough public votes was also chosen by the judges to advance to the finals.

Heat 1 (12 September 2004)

Heat 2 (13 September 2004)

Heat 3 (14 September 2004)

Heat 4 (15 September 2004)

Heat 5 (16 September 2004)

Live Show 1 (24 September 2004)
Theme: My Idol

Live Show 2 (1 October 2004)
Theme: Billboard Number Ones

Live Show 3 (8 October 2004)
Theme: Soul

Live Show 4 (15 October 2004)
Theme: Swedish Hits

Live Show 5 (22 October 2004)
Theme: Max Martin

Live Show 6 (29 October 2004)
Theme: Cocktail

Live Show 7 (5 November 2004)
Theme: Movie Soundtracks

Live Show 8 (12 November 2004)
Theme: My Birth Year

Live Show 9: Semi-final (19 November 2004)
Theme: Judges' Choice

Live final (26 November 2004)

Elimination chart

Notes

References

External links

Idol (Swedish TV series)
2004 in Swedish music
2004 Swedish television seasons